Mansour Mamadou Dia (born 27 December 1940) is a retired Senegalese triple jumper.

At the 1965 All-Africa Games he won the silver medal in triple jump and bronze in long jump. At the 1973 All-Africa Games he won another bronze in long jump, but now a gold medal in the triple jump.

He finished thirteenth at the 1964 Summer Olympics, eighth at the 1968 Summer Olympics, and sixth at the 1972 Summer Olympics.

References

1940 births
Living people
Senegalese male triple jumpers
Senegalese male long jumpers
Athletes (track and field) at the 1964 Summer Olympics
Athletes (track and field) at the 1968 Summer Olympics
Athletes (track and field) at the 1972 Summer Olympics
Olympic athletes of Senegal
African Games gold medalists for Senegal
African Games medalists in athletics (track and field)
Athletes (track and field) at the 1965 All-Africa Games